Brothertoft is a village in Lincolnshire, England, about  northwest from the market town of Boston. It is part of the civil parish of Holland Fen with Brothertoft .

History

Evidence has been found that the area now known as Brothertoft was known to the Romano-British people. The site of a possible building was uncovered at Cannons Farm in Punchbowl Lane between 1957 and 1959. A denarius of Septimius Severus was found along with pottery, potsherds, animal bones, ditches and hollows. A Roman vase was dug up about 1970 at a separate site in Brothertoft by Mr Epton.

The hamlet is first recorded some time after 1350 and before 1540. Brothertoft hamlet is mentioned in the Diocesan Return of 1563 (Deanery of Holland, parish of Kirton,) as having ten households. William Marrat, a local historian writing in 1814, noted that the traditional belief for the origins of the village name lay in a grant being awarded to two brothers in order that they could "inclose" (that is, separate and cultivate) the area from the surrounding fenland. The word toft is thought to come from the Danish occupiers of Lincolnshire in ancient times and has the meaning of homestead or enclosure. Hence the place name of Brother-Toft. In an addendum Marrat wrote that the place had been a vaccaria (or vaccary - literally, a cow shed) of the abbey at Swineshead and had once been called Toft because of it relatively raised position above the fens. There are records of receipts which were probably from the area in the Swineshead entries of the Valor Ecclesiasticus. These are not definitive as another historian of the period, Pishey Thompson, pointed out that Toft was used as a name both for Brothertoft and Fishtoft in the late fourteenth century. The raised position did not exclude the area from flooding and, for example, in 1763 the villagers were forced to live in the upper stories of buildings due to the amount of water ingress.

Sempringham Priory
While the surrounding land belonged to Swineshead in medieval times, the manor of Brothertoft was worked by the Sempringham Priory. The Order of Sempringham originated in 1131. About that time Gilbert of Sempringham became the rector of the church of Sempringam. He then instituted the rule of St. Augustine and many statutes from the customs of Augustinian and Premonstratensian canons. The Valor Ecclesiasticus of 1535 values "Brodertofte" at £9.16s.1d. On 18 September 1538 Brothertoft was surrendered by Robert Holgate, chaplain to Cromell, with Roger the Prior (Prior of 1538) and 16 canons as part of the dissolution of the monasteries.

Carre family of Sleaford
By 1553 Robert Carre (sometimes spelled Carr) of Sleaford owned the manor of Brothertoft, which was left to his cousin Robert Carre. Robert Carre, cousin to Robert Carre, lived at the old Carre House at Sleaford. He died in 1590.

Sir Edward Carre, 1st Baronet of Sleaford, was the owner in 1614 at which time his Brothertoft tenants were charged with the diking of part of South Ea as commoners in Holland fen. Edward was married twice and had three issue from his second marriage to Anne Dyer: Rochester, Sir Robert and Lucy. He resided at old Hall at Dunsby and died in 1618. Sir Robert Carr, son of Edward and 2nd Baronet of Sleaford, and Lady Ann Carr were owners of Brothertoft in 1619. Lady Ann was likely Robert's mother, Ann Dyer Carre.

Lucy Carre, daughter of Sir Robert Carre (died 1667) and "the Lady Mary Carre, daughter of Sir Richard Gargrave, married Sir Francis Holles (1627–89), later 2nd Lord of Holles (also spelled Hollis) in Westminster Abbey. Following Robert Carre's death, Francis Holles successfully secured for Lucy a good portion of Robert Carre's estates, although Brothertoft is not specifically named.

Holles family
The son of Francis Holles, Denzil, was initially the heir of Francis but died within two years of his father, and the land passed to his cousin John Holles, first Duke of Newcastle. Upon his death in 1711, much of his estate passed to his nephew, Thomas Pelham-Holles, who also became Duke of Newcastle.

Charles Frederick
Brothertoft manor was next owned by Sir Charles Frederick Who bought it from Thomas Pelham-Holles, Duke of Newcastle and Katherine Pelham, widow of Henry Pelham in 1761. Frederick died in December 1785, and his son Thomas Lenox Frederick sold it to John Cartwright, Esquire. Cartwright did not purchase the land until 1788.

Holland Fen riot
Prior to Frederick, the fenland often flooded to the point where boats had to be used for transport, and it was during his time at Brothertoft that drainage, and then enclosure began. Around 1767 the inhabitants of Brothertoft, who occupied 52 houses in the hamlet, were "most active" in rioting as a protest against the enclosure of Holland Fen. They regarded this land as being for their pleasure and sustenance, and in particular as a location for fishing and fowling. Aside from general rioting and the removal of recently erected fencing, up to 200 people also played football on the land in an attempt to assert their historic rights, forcing Frederick to send men to guard the area. The situation led to serious injury and deaths, including the loss of an eye by a Captain Wilks who had been employed by Frederick to command the guard and who was shot. This common land had also traditionally been the scene of an annual fair, called the Toft drift, lasting a week from 8 July and attracting visitors from nearby villages and from Boston.

Buildings

Hall

In 1788 the land was bought by Major John Cartwright, the political reformer. He sold his estate at Marnham, Nottinghamshire soon after and by the time he leased the estate and moved to Enfield, Middlesex in 1803 or 1805 had developed the rich loam soil into a profitable site for the cultivation of woad, assisted by new machinery, some of his own invention and some developed by his bailiff and later steward William Amos (agriculturist) He began addressing his letters as being from Brothertoft Farm.

At this time there was a building called Brothertoft Hall or Brothertoft house, to which the farm was an ancillary. Cartwright had extended Brothertoft house with octagonal additions to both ends and had also applied a stucco finish to the walls. Marrat described it as "an elegant mansion". He claims that it was originally built by Thomas Saul, founder of the Baptist chapel in Boston. Pishey Thompson believed the founder of the Boston chapel to be John Saul.

Brothertoft Farm was extended in the early 19th century by Thomas Gee, a son of Henry Gee, a banker of Boston.
Cartwright had married the eldest daughter of Samuel Dashwood in 1780. The lands had a rateable value of £790 4s. 0d. in 1831–1832, with the "extra-parochial Pelham's Lands" being valued at £518 7s. 7d. (Pelham's Lands was near Fosdyke and by the 1870s comprised seven houses and a population of 54). At this time the area was a part of the Kirton Hundred or Wapentake, which itself had a total rateable value of £51,469 15s. 8d. A Mary Beedham, only child of George Beedham, had married a Mr Barnsdale of Brothertoft at Boston around June 1811.

Thomas Gee died in 1871, leaving his wife, Ann Leman Gee, as occupant of the Hall until her death in 1878. They are both buried at Brothertoft. The Hall was subsequently occupied in turn by Frederick Curtois, Charles James Small, Henry Peart, and Ebenezer Larrington, It is still occupied today. Brothertoft Hall, built around 1780 and substantially extended about 1850, is now a Grade II listed building.

Church
The church, which is dedicated to St. Gilbert of Sempringham, was a part of the chapelry of Kirton around 1837 and was owned by the lord of the manor, it being at that time a chapel of ease.

History
The Lincoln Diocesan Record Office holds registers baptisms, marriage and burials for the church going back to 1682.

Marrat was of the opinion that the building was not particularly old, being built of brick and roofed with flat tiles, and that the Saxon window arches were the exception and perhaps indicated an earlier use for the building. He noted that the oldest register was from 1757. However, he subsequently amended his writings on the basis of new information which indicated a construction date around 1600 using materials from a chapel at Coningsby. Lewin also noted that he had seen registers, or perhaps copies of them, for as far back as 1682.

A former monk of Bardney, Otto Buttolle, was curate of Brothertoft in 1554, long before the surviving church records and when the living had an annual stipend of £3 6s. 8d. (He also had an annual pension of £5 under the terms agreed following the dissolution of the monasteries). William Scoffin was curate from around 1683 until his ejection as a consequence of the Bartholomew Act in August 1686. He went on to minister a presbyterian congregation in Sleaford. A later holder of the living was William Tyler, rector and stepfather to Ann Chappell. Chappell married the navigator and cartographer Matthew Flinders in April 1801.

The church was dedicated as a parish church in 1922. Five years later, in 1927 parts of the parishes of Holland Fen, Boston, Wyberton, Frampton, Kirton, Swineshead, Wigtoft, and extra-parochial land were transferred to the benefice of Brothertoft.

Buildings
Stephen Lewin described the church in 1843 as 

Rebuilt between 1847 and 1854 to a design by Lewin, the church is a Grade II listed building and has a small bell tower.

In 1922, when St. Gilberts was dedicated as a parish church, the building of the rectory house was completed.

School
Some form of provision for education existed in the mid-1700s as this is when an "obscure poet", William Hall, was taught in Brothertoft for a period of six months. Thomas Gee erected a school at Brothertoft in 1856. In 1879 the North East Holland Fen United District School Board was formed, and on 4 April 1881 the newly built Hedgehog Bridge School opened on the North Forty Foot Bank, and children were schooled there until it closed in December 1969.
The Misses Gee, sisters of Thomas Gee, opened the Boston Middle Girls School in Boston, which became the Conway School and is now the Excell International School.

Religion

Brothertoft Group
The parish church is now part of the Church of England "Brothertoft Group" in the Diocese of Lincoln, known as the "Five in the Fen" that also includes:
 All Saints at Holland Fen
 Christ Church at Kirton Holme
 St Peter at Wildmore
 St Margaret of Scotland at Langrick

Baptist
There were prayer meetings being held by a group of Baptists in Brothertoft in 1813. These people raised a subscription for a Mission in India.

Demographics

The above table contents are based on official census data and are not comparable to the figures referred to earlier in the text. The Civil Parish gained a part of Fosdyke in 1880, parts of Frampton, Kirton and Wyberton in 1906, and parts of Boston and Langriville in 1932.

Destinations

References

Notes

Further reading

 - archive resources for parish records going back to 1682

External links

Villages in Lincolnshire
Civil parishes in Lincolnshire
Borough of Boston